Don Cesare di Bazan is a 1942 Italian historical adventure film directed by Riccardo Freda and starring Gino Cervi, Anneliese Uhlig and Paolo Stoppa. The film is set during the Catalan Revolt of the Seventeenth century. It is based on a play by Philippe Dumanoir and Adolphe d'Ennery. It marked the directoral debut of Freda who went on to be a leading commercial Italian filmmaker.

Cast
 Gino Cervi as Don Cesare di Bazan  
 Anneliese Uhlig as Renée Dumas  
 Paolo Stoppa as Sancho  
 Enrico Glori as Il visconte di Beaumont  
 Enzo Biliotti as Filippo IV
 Giovanni Grasso as Don José di Nogueira  
 Carlo Duse as Il "Corvo", il messagero del visconte  
 Antonio Marietti as Il giovane conte, il finto attore  
 Alfredo Robert as Pasquale Cornalis, il capocomico  
 Sandrino Moreno as Il bambino  
 Anna Maria Dionisi as La cameriera di Renée  
 Ermanno Donati as Velasquez  
 Antonio Acqua as Il capitano Ribera  
 Armando Francioli as Un nobile cavaliere  
 Alfredo Martinelli as Un nobile cospiratore  
 Angelo Dessy as Il cospiratore che provoca il duello  
 Pietro Tordi as Uno dei finti attori  
 Cellio Bucchi as Il duca di Orovesa  
 Umberto Sclanizza as Il taverniere  
 Evaristo Signorini as Un altro nobile cospiratore

Release
DonCesare di Bazan was released in Italy on 4 October 1942 where it was distributed by Artisti Associati.

References

Bibliography

 
 Moliterno, Gino. The A to Z of Italian Cinema. Scarecrow Press, 2009. 
 Testa, Carlo. Italian Cinema and Modern European Literatures, 1945-2000. Greenwood Publishing Group, 2002.

External links 
 

1942 films
Italian historical adventure films
Italian black-and-white films
1940s historical adventure films
1940s Italian-language films
Films directed by Riccardo Freda
Films set in the 17th century
Films set in Spain
Italian films based on plays
Films with screenplays by Cesare Zavattini
Films based on works by Victor Hugo
1942 directorial debut films
1940s Italian films